This is a list of works by Russian writer Leo Tolstoy (1828–1910), including his novels, novellas, short stories, fables and parables, plays, and nonfiction.

Prose Fiction

Novels
War and Peace (Война и мир [Voyna i mir], 1869)
Anna Karenina (Анна Каренина [Anna Karenina], 1877)
Resurrection (Воскресение [Voskresenie], 1899)

Novellas
The Autobiographical Trilogy (1852-1856)
Childhood (Детство [Detstvo], 1852)
Boyhood (Отрочество [Otrochestvo], 1854)
Youth (Юность [Yunost'], 1856)
Sevastopol Sketches (Севастопольские рассказы [Sevastopolskie rasskazy], 1855–1856)
"Sevastopol in December 1854" (1855)
"Sevastopol in May 1855" (1855)
"Sevastopol in August 1855" (1856)
 A Morning of a Landed Proprietor (Утро помещика, 1856)
 Two Hussars (Два гусара [Dva gusara], 1856)
 Family Happiness (Семейное счастье [], 1859)
 Polikúshka (Поликушка [Polikushka], 1862)
 The Cossacks (Казаки [Kazaki], 1863)
 The Death of Ivan Ilyich (Смерть Ивана Ильича [Smert' Ivana Il'icha], 1886)
 The Kreutzer Sonata (Крейцерова соната [Kreitserova Sonata], 1889)
 The Devil (Дьявол [Dyavol] 1911, written 1889)
 Walk in the Light While There is Light (Ходите в свете, пока есть свет, 1893)
 Master and Man (Хозяин и работник [Khozyain and rabotnik], 1895)
 The Forged Coupon (Фальшивый купон [Fal'shivyi kupon], 1911)
 Hadji Murat (Хаджи-Мурат [Khadzhi-Murat], 1912, 1917)

Short stories

A History of Yesterday ("История вчерашнего дня") (1851)
"The Raid" ("Набег" ["Nabeg"], 1852)
"The Cutting of the Forest" (1855)
"Recollections of a Billiard-marker" ("Записки маркера" ["Zapiski markera"], 1855)
"The Snowstorm" ("Метель" ["Metel"], 1856)
"Lucerne" ("Люцерн" ["Lyutsern"], 1857)
"Albert" ("Альберт" ["Al'bert"], 1858)
"Three Deaths" ("Три смерти" ["Tri smerti"], 1859)
"The Porcelain Doll" (1863)
"God Sees the Truth, But Waits" ("Бог правду видит, да не скоро скажет" ["Bog pravdu vidit, da ne skoro skazhet"], 1872)
"The Prisoner in the Caucasus" ("Кавказский пленник" ["Kavkazskii plennik"], 1872)
"The Bear Hunt" (1872)
"Memoirs of a Madman" (1884)
"Croesus and Fate" (1886)
"An Old Acquaintance" (1887)
"Stories of My Dogs" (1888)
"Kholstomer" or "Strider" ("Холстомер", 1888)
"A Lost Opportunity" (1889)
" Françoise" ("Франсуаза", 1891)
"A Dialogue Among Clever People" (1892)
"The Coffee-House of Surat" ("Суратская кофейная", 1893)
"The Young Tsar" (1894)
"Too Dear!" ("Дорого стоит" ["Dorogo stoit"], 1897)
"Father Sergius" ("Отец Сергий" ["Otetz Sergij"], 1898)
"Khodynka: An Incident of the Coronation of Nicholas II" ("Ходынка", 1898, published 1912)

"Work, Death, and Sickness" (1903)
"Three Questions" ("Три вопроса" ["Tri voprosa"], 1903)
"After the Ball" ("После бала" ["Posle bala"], (1903)
"Alyosha the Pot" ("Алёша Горшок" ["Alyosha Gorshok"], 1905)
"Poor People" ("Бедные люди") (1905)
"Posthumous Notes of the Hermit Fëdor Kuzmich" ("Посмертные записки старца Федора Кузьмича") (1905, published 1912)
"Divine and Human" ("Божеское и человеческое", 1906)
"What For?" ("За что?", 1906)
"There Are No Guilty People" (1909)
"Traveller and Peasant" ("Проезжий и крестьянин", 1909, published 1917)
"Singing In The Village" ("Песни на деревне", 1910)
"A Talk With A Wayfarer" ("Разговор с прохожим", 1910)
"Three Days in the Village" ("Три дня в деревне", 1910)
"My Dream" ("Что я видел во сне", 1911)
Stories that have not been translated into English:
"Разжалованный" (1856)
"Прыжок" (1880)
"Рассказ Аэронавта" (1880)
"Корней Васильев" (1906)
"Ягоды" (1906)
"Благодарная почва" (1910)
"Идиллия" (1911, written 1861-62)
"Кто прав?" (1911, written 1891—1893)
"Отец Василий" (1911, written 1906)
"Сон молодого царя" (1912, written 1894)
"Сила детства" (1912, written 1908)
"Святочная ночь" (1928, written 1853)
"Как умирают русские солдаты" (1928, written 1854)
"Отрывки рассказов из деревенской жизни" (1932, written 1860—1862)

Fables and parables

"The Two Horses" ("Две лошади", 1880)
"What Men Live By" ("Чем люди живы" ["Chem lyudi zhivy"], 1881)
"Karma" ("Карма", 1894)
"The Two Brothers and the Gold" (Два брата и золото) (1886, written 1885)
"Ilyás" ("Ильяс", 1885)
"Where Love Is, God Is" ("Где любовь, там и бог", 1885)
"Evil Allures, But Good Endures" ("Вражье лепко, а божье крепко", 1885)
"Wisdom of Children" ("Девчонки умнее стариков", 1885)
"Quench the Spark" ("Упустишь огонь, не потушишь" ["Upustish ogon', ne potushish"], 1885)
"Two Old Men" ("Два старика", 1885)
"The Candle" ("Свечка", 1886)
"Ivan the Fool" ("Сказка об дураке", 1885)
"The Three Hermits" ("Три Старца", 1886)

"Promoting a Devil" ("Как чертёнок краюшку выкупал", 1886)
"Repentance" ("Кающийся грешник", 1886)
"The Grain" ("Зерно с куриное яйцо", 1886)
"How Much Land Does a Man Need?" ("Много ли человеку земли нужно", 1886)
"The Godson" ("Крестник", 1886)
"Three Sons" ("Три сына", 1889, written 1887)
"The Empty Drum" ("Работник Емельян и пустой барабан", 1891)
"Three Parables" (Три притчи) (1895) 
"The Restoration of Hell" ("Разрушение ада и восстановление его", 1903, written 1902)
"Esarhaddon, King of Assyria" ("Ассирийский царь Асархадон", 1903)
Fables that have not been translated into English:
"Две различные версии истории улья с лубочной крышкой" (1912, written 1900)
"Волк" (1909, written 1908)

Collections

Twenty-Three Tales

Unfinished 
 The Decembrists (Декабристы, written 1860-1863, published 1884)
 Peter the First (written 1870-1879, published 1936)
 Prince Fyodor Shchetinin (written 1877-1878, published 1935)
 Hundred Years (written 1877-1879)

Plays
The Power of Darkness (Власть тьмы [Vlast' t'my], 1886)
The First Distiller (1886)
The Light Shines in Darkness (1890)
The Fruits of Enlightenment (Плоды просвещения [Plody prosvesheniya], 1891)
The Living Corpse (Живой труп [Zhivoi trup], 1900)
The Cause of It All (1910)

Non-fiction

Philosophical works

Available in English

A Confession (1879) – Volume 1 of an untitled four-part work
The Gospel in Brief, or A Short Exposition of the Gospel (1881)
What I Believe (also called My Religion) (1884) – Volume 4 of an untitled four-part work
 Christ's Christianity And What To Do (1885), containing 'How I Came to Believe,' 'What I Believe,' and 'The Spirit of Christ's Teaching.' Translated by Francis Prevost
Church and State (1886)
What Is to Be Done? (also translated as What Then Must We Do?) (1886)
On Life (1887)
 Power and Liberty (Сила и свобода; 1888)
 Supplementary essay for Timofei Bondarev's The Triumph of the Farmer or Industry and Parasitism  (1888)
Why Do Men Intoxicate Themselves? (1890)
The First Step (1891)
The Kingdom of God Is Within You (1893)
Non-Activity (1893)
Christianity and Patriotism (1894)
A Letter to the Liberals (1896)
Thou Shalt Not Kill (1900)
The Slavery of Our Times (1900)
Bethink Yourselves! (1904) 
The Only Need (1905)
 (1908) 
A Letter to a Hindu (1908)
The Inevitable Revolution (1909)
A Calendar of Wisdom (Путь Жизни [Put' Zhizni]; compilation; 1909)

Untranslated

The Great Sin (Великий грех, 1905)
Do Not Kill (1906)
Love Each Other (1906)
An Appeal to Youth (1907)
The Only Command (1909)
Reason and Religion (1894)
Religion and Morality (1894)
Non-Resistance: letter to Ernest H. Crosby (1896)
How to Read the Gospels (1896)
The Deception of the Church (1896)
Christian Teaching (1898)
On Suicide (1900)
Reply to the Holy Synod (1901)
The Only Way (1901)
On Religious Toleration (1901)
О половом вопросе [O polovom voprose] (“On the Sexual Question”; compilation by Vladimir Chertkov; 1901)
What Is Religion and What is its Essence? (1902)
To the Orthodox Clergy (1903)
A Criticism of Dogmatic Theology (1880) – Volume 2 of an untitled four-part work
The Four Gospel Unified and Translated (1881) – Volume 3 of an untitled four-part work

Works on art and literature
The Works of Guy de Maupassant (1894)
What Is Art? (1897)
Shakespeare and the Drama (1909)

Articles, publicism
Meaningless aspirations (Бессмысленные мечтания [Bessmyslennye mechtaniya], 1895)
I can't be silent (Не могу молчать [Ne mogu molchat'''], 1908)

Pedagogical works
Articles from Tolstoy's journal on education, Yasnaya Polyana (1861–1862)A Primer (1872)On Popular Instruction (1874)A New Primer'' (1875)

References

External links
 
 Leo Tolstoy Archive, at RevoltLib.com
 Leo Tolstoy Archive, at Marxists.org
 Leo Tolstoy Archive, at TheAnarchistLibrary.org
 
 
 Online Books Page — free, public-domain books and articles by Tolstoy available online

Bibliography
Bibliographies by writer
Bibliographies of Russian writers
Christian bibliographies